Garneau–Québecor is a Canadian UCI Continental cycling team established in 2012.

Team roster

Major wins

2012
Stages 7 & 8b (ITT) Vuelta a la Independencia Nacional, Bruno Langlois
Stage 6 Tour de Beauce, Bruno Langlois
Satge 6 Tour de Guadeloupe, Bruno Langlois
Prologue Tour du Rwanda, Rémi Pelletier-Roy
Stages 4 & 8 Tour du Rwanda, Bruno Langlois
2015
Stages 2 & 4 Grand Prix Cycliste de Saguenay, Bruno Langlois
2016
Stage 3b Tour de Beauce, Michael Rice
2017
Stage 4 Grand Prix Cycliste de Saguenay, Marc-Antoine Soucy

References

UCI Continental Teams (America)
Cycling teams established in 2012
Cycling teams based in Canada